Rita Nagel, known professionally as Mary Ann Nagel, is a German singer. Nagel is notable for being the founding member of the Arabesque girl group in 1977.

Life and career
Mary Ann Nagel was born as Rita Nagel in 1955. She took on the pseudonym of "Mary Ann" and began to sing from a very young age. She first released children's songs: So Viele Fragen / Laß mich nicht so lang allein" in 1968 and "Pony Girl / Du Ich Lieb' Dich Candy Man" in 1972. This was followed by schlager single "Schau Mich Nicht So Böse An / Ein Tag So Schön Wie Heut" in 1973. The singles did not have much success. Inspired by the recent success of the Silver Convention and other girl groups, Nagel and producers sought to create another girl group. Arabesque was formed in 1977, and "Hello Mr. Monkey" was released as the first single featuring lead vocals by Nagel. Her participation in the group was short-lived however, she only recorded two songs with the group: disco songs "Hello Mr. Monkey / Buggy Boy". Nagel's family life became more important than her career as a singer. She was married, had a son, and disliked the long driving from her hometown of Karlsruhe, Germany to Offenbach am Main, where the group was based. Mary Ann was part of Arabesque for a little over a year; she left in September 1978 and was replaced by Heike Rimbeau.

References

Living people
1955 births
German women pop singers